Holborn is an area of Central London, England.

Holborn may also refer to:

 Holborn District (Metropolis), a local government district in the metropolitan area of London
 Metropolitan Borough of Holborn, a local government district in the County of London
 Holborn division, a former subdivision of England
 Holborn (UK Parliament constituency), a parliamentary constituency centred on the Holborn district of Central London
 Holborn tramway station, a tram stop underneath Kingsway in central London
 Holborn tube station, a station of the London Underground
 Holborn, an area in the Lower Hutt suburb of Stokes Valley in New Zealand
Holborn, the defunct Dutch computer manufacturer, produced the Holborn 9100 computer.

People with the surname
 Abbie Holborn, British reality television personality
 Demi Holborn (b. 1992), Welsh singer
 Hajo Holborn (1902–1969), German-American historian
Hanna Holborn Gray (b. 1930), daughter of Hajo Holborn, German-American historian
 Robert Holborn (16th century), English shipwright

Fictional characters:
 Jack Holborn, the main character of the television miniseries Jack Holborn

See also 
 Holborn Head
 Holborn Hill
 Old Holborn, tobacco

English-language surnames